A-kinase anchor protein 4 is a scaffold protein that in humans is encoded by the AKAP4 gene. It involves in the intracellular signalling of protein kinase -A. AKAP4 is called as cancer /testis antigen (CTA), it belongs to a class of tumour linked antigens categories by high expression in germ cells and cancer than normal tissues. AKAP4 is not normally expressed in mRNA and protein level in MM cell line.

Function 

The A-kinase anchor proteins (AKAPs) are a group of structurally diverse proteins, which have the common function of binding to the regulatory subunit of protein kinase A (PKA) and confining the holoenzyme to discrete locations within the cell. This gene encodes a member of the AKAP family. The encoded protein is localized to the sperm flagellum and may be involved in the regulation of sperm motility. Alternative splicing of this gene results in two transcript variants encoding different isoforms.

AKAP 4 protein belongs to the family of scaffold proteins and is involved in controlled mechanism of flagellar function. In mice, AKAP4 is required for sperm development and male mice that lack AKAP4 are infertiel The fibrous sheath was not formed, flagellum become short and often some proteins associated with the fibrous sheath in this case they were very few or absent. Surprisingly, another component of flagellum was developed as normal. In the conclusion, they state that AKAP4 plays a pivotal role in the fibrous sheath and effect on the motility of sperm, in the absence of AKAP4 these activities affected due to a failure of signal transduction and glycolytic enzymes because they were not able to attach with the fibrous sheath.

Clinical significance

AKAP4 is a potential biomarker for early diagnosis and immunotherapy of colon cancer. AKAP4 may be implicated as a biomarker and immunotherapeutic target for cervical cancer. AKAP4 is also a circulating biomarker for non-small cell lung cancer. To detect the early stage breast cancer and diagnosis, AKAP4 is used as serum. Investigation was undertaken about AKAP4 with various clinical parameters which could be use as early detector biomarker to treat cancer by developing a tissue or serum.

AKAP4 is associated with diseases such as multiple myeloma, lung cancer, breast cancer and prostate cancer.

AKAP4 is over expressed in multiple myeloma (MM)

Interactions 

AKAP4 has been shown to interact with:
 AKAP3, and
 PRKAR1A.

References

Further reading

External links 
 

A-kinase-anchoring proteins